The 2nd Edward Jancarz Memorial was the 1993 version of the Edward Jancarz Memorial, a motorcycle speedway race. It took place on 10 June in the Stal Gorzów Stadium in Gorzów Wielkopolski, Poland. The Memorial was won by Gary Havelock who beat Piotr Świst and Antonín Kasper, Jr.

Heat details 
 10 June 1993 (Thursday)
 Best Time: 64.34 - Hans Nielsen in Heat 10
 Attendance: ?
 Referee: Stanisław Pieńkowski

Heat after heat 
 (67.58) Baron, Sawina, Franczyszyn, Brhel
 (64.50) Nielsen, Dudek, Charczenko, Kuczwalski (X)
 (66.88) Świst, Wilson, Kasper, Paluch
 (66.19) Havelock, Łukaszewski, Flis, Huszcza
 (64.46) Nielsen, Kasper, Huszcza, Franczyszyn
 (67.99) Havelock, Charczenko, Paluch, Baron (R)
 (67.46) Dudek, Świst, Flis, Sawina
 (66.96) Brhel, Wilson, Kuczwalski, Łukaszewski
 (66.39) Świst, Franczyszyn, Łukaszewski, Charczenko
 (64.34) Nielsen, Baron, Flis, Wilson
 (66.08) Kasper, Havelock, Sawina, Kuczwalski
 (68.81) Paluch, Huszcza, Brhel, Dudek
 (67.12) Dudek, Wilson, Havelock, Franczyszyn
 (68.31) Baron, Huszcza, Świst, Kuczwalski
 (69.44) Paluch, Łukaszewski, Sawina (x), Nielsen (X)
 (68.16) Charczenko, Kasper, Brhel, Hućko, Flis (-)
 (68.88) Kuczwalski, Franczyszyn, Paluch, Flis
 (67.94) Kasper, Baron, Hućko (R), Łukaszewski (R), Dudek (T/-)
 (67.10) Huszcza, Sawina, Wilson, Charczenko
 (68.27) Havelock, Świst, Nielsen, Brhel
 Second place Run-Off
 (66.26) Świst, Kasper

See also 
 motorcycle speedway
 1993 in sports

References

External links 
 (Polish) Stal Gorzów Wlkp. official webside

Memorial
1993
Edward J